Tabernacle Dome is a 6,430-foot (1,960 meter) elevation summit located in Zion National Park, in Washington County of southwest Utah, United States. Its nearest higher neighbor is  Cave Knoll,  to the north-northwest. Other neighbors include South Guardian Angel,  to the east, and North Guardian Angel,  to the northeast. Precipitation runoff from this mountain drains into tributaries of the Virgin River. Access to this peak is via the Kolob Terrace Road. This peak's name was officially adopted in 1934 by the U.S. Board on Geographic Names. It is named for its resemblance to the Mormon Tabernacle in Salt Lake City.

Climate
Spring and fall are the most favorable seasons to visit Tabernacle Dome. According to the Köppen climate classification system, it is located in a Cold semi-arid climate zone, which is defined by the coldest month having an average mean temperature below 32 °F (0 °C), and at least 50% of the total annual precipitation being received during the spring and summer.

See also

 List of mountains in Utah
 Geology of the Zion and Kolob canyons area
 Colorado Plateau

References

External links

 Zion National Park National Park Service
 Tabernacle Dome: Weather forecast
 Tabernacle Dome photo: Flickr

Mountains of Utah
Zion National Park
Mountains of Washington County, Utah
Sandstone formations of the United States
Landforms of Washington County, Utah
North American 1000 m summits